The Corrs: Live at the Royal Albert Hall is the Corrs' first video album, released on DVD on 28 August 1998. The show was recorded and broadcast live on St. Patricks Day by the BBC while the band were on their Talk on Corners World Tour in the UK. Mick Fleetwood joined the band on stage for "Dreams", "Haste to the Wedding" and "Toss the Feathers".

Track listing
 Intro
 "When He's Not Around"
 "No Good For Me"
 "Love To Love You"
 "Forgiven, Not Forgotten"
 "Joy of Life"
 "Intimacy"
 "What Can I Do?"
 "The Right Time"
 "Queen Of Hollywood"
 "Dreams" (with Mick Fleetwood)
 "Haste to the Wedding" (with Mick Fleetwood)
 "Runaway"
 "Only When I Sleep"
 "Hopelessly Addicted"
 "I Never Loved You Anyway"
 "So Young"
 "Toss the Feathers" (with Mick Fleetwood)

Certifications

References

The Corrs albums
1998 live albums
1998 video albums
Live video albums
Atlantic Records live albums
Atlantic Records video albums
Warner Music Vision live albums
Warner Music Vision video albums
Lava Records live albums
Lava Records video albums
143 Records live albums
143 Records video albums